"Here's to You, Mrs Boyce" is an episode of the BBC sitcom, The Green Green Grass. It was first screened on 22 September 2006, as the second episode of series two.

Synopsis

Tyler needs another load of help on his schoolwork, so a student-tutor comes to the house to try to help Tyler revise, although it's Marlene the student tutor puts his attention on. When this tutor makes a pass at Marlene, Boycie enters and mistakes the kiss for an epileptic seizure, so Boycie – who is running for Mayor – attempts to revive the tutor with mouth to mouth – which leads to the tutor fancying Boycie instead. Meanwhile, Tyler tries to impress Beth by joining the school's rugby team.

Episode cast

References

British TV Comedy Guide for The Green Green Grass
BARB viewing figures

2006 British television episodes
The Green Green Grass episodes